Danakilia is a genus of cichlids native to northeastern Africa where they are only known from saline lakes, rivers and creeks in the Danakil Depression of Ethiopia and Eritrea. There are two formally described species, along with three undescribed species currently known.

Species
There are currently two recognized species in this genus:
 Danakilia dinicolai Stiassny, de Marchi & Lamboj, 2010
 Danakilia franchettii (Vinciguerra, 1931)

See also
 Alcolapia – another cichlid genus from warm, saline lakes in Africa.

References

 
Oreochromini
Cichlid genera